Mārtiņš Laksa (born 26 June 1990) is a professional Latvian basketball player for CBet Jonava of the Lithuanian Basketball League.

Laksa started his career with ASK Rīga junior squad. In August 2009 Laksa tried out for Spanish club Bilbao Basket. Starting from 2009-2010 season Laksa played for VEF Rīga, where he spent three years. After playing in Riga Laksa made a move to BK Ventspils. He also played for the Spanish club Monbus Obradoiro in Liga ACB. In August 2021, Laksa signed with Alba Fehérvár of the Hungarian Nemzeti Bajnokság I/A. He averaged 12.7 points, 4.2 rebounds, and 1.5 assists per game. On January 22, 2022, Laksa signed with Gießen 46ers of the Basketball Bundesliga.

Laksa has represented the Latvian national youth team and Latvian men's national team in several competitions.

Mārtiņš Laksa is son of former Latvian NT player Jānis Laksa.

References

1990 births
Living people
BK Jūrmala players
BK Valmiera players
BK VEF Rīga players
BK Ventspils players
Latvian expatriate basketball people in Poland
Latvian expatriate basketball people in Spain
Latvian men's basketball players
Liga ACB players
Obradoiro CAB players
Shooting guards
Start Lublin players